The Indiana State Poet Laureate is the poet laureate for the U.S. state of Indiana. Senate Enrolled Act No. 433 created the made the position effective July 1, 2005, but Indiana had a well-established unofficial position of state poet laureate since 1929. Laureates  serve a two-year term. The selection of Indiana State Poet Laureate is made by the Indiana Arts Commission executive director and seven members chosen by the commission who represent institutions of higher education.

Current Indiana State Poet Laureate 
 Matthew Graham (January 1, 2020 – Present)

Previous Official Laureates
 Adrian Matejka (January 1, 2018 – December 31, 2019)
 Shari Wagner (January 1, 2016 – December 31, 2017)
 George Kalamaras (January 1, 2014 – December 31, 2015)
 Karen Kovacik (January 1, 2012 – December 31, 2013)
 Norbert Krapf (June 17, 2008 – 2010)
 Joyce Brinkman (July 1, 2005 – June 2008)

Previous Unofficial Laureates

 Emory Aaron Richardson (named 1929 by motion of the General Assembly)
 Mary Hagler LeMaster (1945)
 Florence Marie Taylor (1946)
 William Chitwood (1947)
 Effie Lydia Fisher (1948)
 Mina Morris Scott (1949)
 Ollah Eloise Toph (1950)
 Alma C. Mahan (1951)
 Mable Newman (1952)
 Myrl G. New (1953)
 Thelma Howell Porter (1954)
 Nellie Baldwin Rudser (1955)
 Samuel S. Biddle (1956)
 Gwen Robert Boyer (1957)
 Jeannette Vaughn Konley (1958)
 Clarence O. Adams (1959)
 Carl Stader (1960–1961)
 Mildred Musgrave (1962)
 Mable Skeen (1963)
 Lloyd Whitehead (1964)
 Glen Galbraith (1965)
 Frances Brown Price (1966)
 Elsie Startzman (1967)
 Mildred Musgrave Shartle (1968)
 Paul Startzman (1969)
 Dr. Earl Marlott (1970)
 Marjorie Sea Fortmeyer (1971)
 Mary Simmons (1972)
 Florence Helen McGaughey (1973)
 Frances Brown Price (1974)
 Georgia Ellis  (1975)
 Laverne Hanson Brown (1976–1977)
 Arthur Franklin Mapes (named 1977 by House Concurrent Resolution 63)
 Glenna Glee Jenkins (1979–1980)
 Vivian Pierson Ramsey (1981–1982)
 Esther Alman (1983–1984)
 Kay (Kinnaman) Sims (1985–1986)
 Dena Adams (1987–1988)
 Paula Fehn (1989–1990)
 Dr. J.C.Bacala (1991–1992)
 Jeanne Losey (1993–1997)
 Esther Towns (1998–2000)
 Glenna Glee Jenkins (2001–2003)
 Carol Ogdon Floyd (2004 – October 2007)

See also

 Poets laureate of U.S. states
 Poet laureate
 List of U.S. states' poets laureate
 United States Poet Laureate

External links
Poets Laureate of Indiana at the Library of Congress

Notes 

Lists of poets
Indiana culture
American poetry awards
Poets Laureate of Indiana
American Poets Laureate